Protubera is a genus of fungi in the family Phallogastraceae. The genus has a widespread distribution in tropical and subtropical areas, and contains 13 species.

Species

References

External links

Hysterangiales
Agaricomycetes genera